Caraquet is a civil parish in Gloucester County, New Brunswick, Canada.

For governance purposes, the parish is divided between the towns of Caraquet, Hautes-Terres, Rivière-du-Nord, and Shippagan. All municipalities are members of the Acadian Peninsula Regional Service Commission (APRSC).

Origin of name
Historian William F. Ganong described the origin of the name as uncertain, the Mi'kmaq Caluget possibly being their pronunciation of a French name for the area.

History
Caraquet was erected in 1831 from Saumarez Parish; it originally included Shippegan Parish and Paquetville Parish.

In 1851 Shippegan was erected as its own parish.

In 1897 Paquetville was erected as its own parish.

Boundaries
Caraquet Parish is bounded:

 on the north by the Caraquet River, Caraquet Bay, and Chaleur Bay;
 on the east by Baie de Shippagan, Baie Brûlé, Saint-Simon Inlet, Baie Saint-Simon-Sud (the line passing west of Île à William), a line from Baie-Saint-Simon-Sud to Baie de Petit-Pokemouche across the isthmus connecting Taylor Island to the mainland, and the Gulf of Saint Lawrence.
 on the south by the mouth of the Pokemouche River, Grande Anse, the rear line of a tier of grants along the Pokemouche River and Route 345 and its prolongation to a point 300 chains (6.035 km) inland, then in a direct line to the northwestern corner of 255 on the western side of Lavigne Road, a bit south of the end of Chemin Gauvin est.
 on the west by the rear line of grants on the west side of Lavigne Road northwesterly three grants, then slightly more westerly to the rear line of grants on the southern side of Duval Road, then southwesterly to the southernmost corner of the tier of grants, then northwesterly along the western line of the Duval Road tier and its prolongation to the Caraquet River.
 Caraquet Island, Pokesudie, L'Îlette de Pokesudie, and Munro Island are all in Caraquet Parish.

Former Governance
The northern mainland of the parish was divided (before 2023) into three municipalities; from east to west, these are the village of Bas-Caraquet, the town of Caraquet, and the eastern part of the village of Bertrand. The remainder of the parish comprised four LSDs and part of a fifth. These LSDs were:
 
 Blanchard Settlement (August 4, 1987) assessed for the additional services of street lighting and community services, both added in 1988. Consisted of the community of Village-Blanchard (formerly Blanchard Settlement) and grants along the Waugh and Godin Roads.
 
 Inkerman Centre (extended into parish on April 21, 1987) assessed for the additional service of street lighting. The portion in this parish consisted of the grants south of the wetlands along Ruisseau à Jules and all of the parish south of those grants.
 
 Pokesudie (March 22, 1988) assessed for the additional services of street lighting (added 1988) and community services. Consisted of Pokesudie Island and Little Pokesudie Island. The community of Pokesudie is on the main island.
 
 St. Simon (September 22, 1971) assessed for the additional services of street lighting and recreational facilities. Consists of grants east of the former CNR line and north of the wetlands along Ruisseau à Isaac. Included the communities of Centre-Saint-Simon and Haut-Saint-Simon; the corresponding taxing authority was Saint-Simon.
 The parish of Caraquet (established 1968). Originally including all the unincorporated parts of the parish, it was eventually reduced to four mainland areas and two islands. The taxing authority was Par. de Caraquet.
 
 Grants in the southwestern corner of the parish, along Thériault, Lavigne, and Haché Roads, containing more than five thousand acres.
 
 Wetlands along Ruisseau à Isaac and Ruisseau à Jules.
 
 Ten grants between the mouth of the Saint-Simon River and the southwestern corner of Bas-Caraquet, containing about nine hundred acres.
 
 A small area on the southern bank of the Saint-Simon River where the Caraquet boundary cuts through a peninsula, containing less than five acres.
 
 Munro Island
 
 Caraquet Island

Communities
Communities at least partly within the parish. bold indicates an incorporated municipality

 Bas-Caraquet
 Middle Caraquet
 Morais
 Bertrand
 Thériault
 Caraquet
 Haut-Caraquet
 Le Bouthillier
 Pointe-Rocheuse
 Sainte-Anne-du-Bocage
 Centre-Saint-Simon
 Haut-Saint-Simon
 Pokesudie
 Village-Blanchard

Bodies of water
Bodies of water at least partly within the parish.

 Rivière à Brideau
 Petite rivière Caraquet
 Saint-Simon River
 Waugh River
 Caraquet Bay
 Caraquet Harbour
 Chaleur Bay
 Baie de Petit-Pokemouche
 Petit-Pokemouche Gully
 Pokemouche Gully
 Saint-Simon Inlet
 Baie Saint-Simon-Nord
 Baie Saint-Simon-Sud
 Shippegan Bay
 more than a half-dozen named lakes

Islands
Islands at least partly within the parish.
 Caraquet Island
 Little Pokesudie Island (French L'Îlette de Pokesudie)
 Munro Island
 Pokesudie Island

Other notable places
Parks, historic sites, and other noteworthy places at least partly within the parish.
 Pokemouche Airport

Demographics
Parish population total does not include incorporated municipalities as they existed in 2021. Revised census figures based on the 2023 local governance reforms have not been released.

Population

Language

See also
List of parishes in New Brunswick

Notes

References

External links
 Village de Bas-Caraquet
 Village de Bertrand
 Ville de Caraquet

Parishes of Gloucester County, New Brunswick
Local service districts of Gloucester County, New Brunswick